Stenopus spinosus is a shrimp-like decapod crustacean belonging to the infraorder Stenopodidea.

Description
The uropods and telson have red tips.

Distribution
Stenopus spinosus is commonly found in shallow waters in the Mediterranean Sea, and at greater depths in adjacent parts of the Atlantic Ocean. It is frequently encountered on night dives in parts of its range. A record of S. spinosus from the Red Sea proved to be a different species, Engystenopus spinulatus.

References

External links

 

Stenopodidea
Crustaceans of the Atlantic Ocean
Crustaceans described in 1827
Taxa named by Antoine Risso